Novoeste may refer to:
 Novoeste (newspaper)
 Novoeste (railway company)